Tanković is a surname. Notable people with the surname include:

Armin Tanković (born 1990), Swedish footballer
Ivica Tanković, Croatian footballer
Muamer Tanković (born 1995), Swedish footballer

See also
Janković
Tanović
Tarkovič

Bosnian surnames